TuSimple Holdings, Inc. is an American autonomous trucking company, based in San Diego, California, with offices in Arizona, Texas, and China.  It was founded in 2015 by Xiaodi Hou and Mo Chen. Initial financial backers include Volkswagen, United Parcel Services, and U.S. Xpress Enterprises. The company was the first autonomous trucking company to go public on the NASDAQ composite index in April 2021. TuSimple and its leadership are currently under investigation by the Federal Bureau of Investigation (FBI), U.S. Securities and Exchange Commission (SEC), and Committee on Foreign Investment in the United States (CFIUS) on suspicions of illicit technology transfer.

History 
In April 2021, the company raised over US$1 billion in an initial public offering, leading to a valuation of almost $8.5 billion. 

In early 2022, the company announced that it had been running trucks without human drivers on over 550 miles of public roads between Phoenix and Tucson, Arizona. This practice distinguishes the company from its competitors, which operate trucks with human safety drivers to take over when necessary. The company stated that it is the first company to "operate fully driverless heavy-duty trucks."

The company also announced that it planned to expand autonomous freight services to Texas by the end of 2023.

2022 U.S. federal investigations

Safety issues 
On May 26, 2022,  the U.S. National Highway Traffic Safety Administration launched an investigation of an April 6, 2022 accident in which one of the company's autonomous trucks crashed into a concrete barrier while on Interstate 10 near Tucson. Company officials blamed the accident on "human error," but former employees and experts in the field of autonomous vehicles suggest that there were issues with the company's technology.

Illicit technology transfer 
In October 2022, the company's CEO, Chief Technology Officer, and co-founder, Xiaodi Hou, was fired by the company's board, which cited a "loss in trust and confidence" in Hou's judgment in connection with an alleged sharing of confidential information with a Chinese company, Hydron Inc. Hydron is a hydrogen truck startup founded by Mo Chen, who co-founded TuSimple with Hou. TuSimple's Chief Operations Officer, Ersin Yumer, was named interim CEO. Hou responded to his ouster by stating that he would be "vindicated." The FBI, the SEC, and CFIUS are investigating TuSimple on suspicions of illicit technology transfer to Hydron in China. CFIUS recommended that the United States Department of Justice bring criminal charges of economic espionage against the management of TuSimple.

References

External links 

 

Electric trucks
Self-driving car companies
Truck manufacturers
Electric vehicle manufacturers
Electric vehicle industry
Companies based in California